Canalisporium elegans is a lignicolous fungus species in the genus Canalisporium found in Malaysia.

References

External links
 mycobank.org
 

Fungi described in 1989
Sordariomycetes enigmatic taxa
Fungi of Asia
Biota of Malaysia